The North Wales Police and Crime Commissioner is the police and crime commissioner, an elected official tasked with setting out the way crime is tackled by North Wales Police in the Welsh principal areas of Anglesey, Conwy, Denbighshire, Flintshire, Gwynedd and Wrexham. The post was created in November 2012, following an election held on 15 November 2012, and replaced the North Wales Police Authority. The current incumbent is Andy Dunbobbin, who represents the Labour Party.

List of North Wales Police and Crime Commissioners

References

Police and crime commissioners in Wales